A panzerotto (plural panzerotti , also known as panzarotto ), is a savory turnover that originated in Central and Southern Italian cuisine which resembles a small calzone, both in shape and dough used for its preparation. The term usually applies to a fried turnover rather than an oven-baked pastry (i.e. a calzone), though calzoni and panzerotti are often mistaken for each other.

Etymology
The noun panzerotto comes from a diminutive of panza, a regional variation of Italian pancia ("belly, tummy"), referring to the distinctive swelling of the pastry which resembles a belly bloating.

Although etymologically related, the word  refers to a totally different dish from panzerotti, denoting a kind of ravioli which is typical of Genoa.

Panzerotti are also popular in the United States and Canada as well, where it is often called panzerotti or panzarotti as a singular noun (plural panzerotties/panzarotties or panzarottis/panzarottis).

Italy
Panzerotti originated in Southern Italy and Central Italy, especially in the Apulian cuisine. They are basically small versions of calzoni but are usually fried rather than oven-baked, which is why they are also known as calzoni fritti ("fried calzones") or pizze fritte ("fried pizzas") in Italy, most typically in Campania. In parts of Apulia, such as Molfetta and Mola di Bari (both in the Metropolitan City of Bari), panzerotti also go by the name of frittelle or frittelli ("fritters"), while in Brindisi they are known as fritte (a local variation of frittelle).

The most common fillings for this turnover are tomato and mozzarella. Peeled whole tomatoes are drained and dried to be used as a filling, as using non-dried tomatoes will cause the dough to rip due to the moisture. Other fillings are onions sauteed in olive oil and seasoned with salted anchovies and capers, or mortadella and provolone cheese. 

A different recipe for panzerotti is panzerotti di patate ("potato panzerottis"), a specialty from Salento which consists of mashed potato croquettes rather than panzerotti as the term is most typically intended.

North America
Panzerotti are also consumed in North America, where they were imported by Southern Italian immigrants at the time of the Italian diaspora.

As for their shape and texture, they can come in various sizes, and are usually semicircular. They consist of a pocket of dough filled with varying amounts of melted mozzarella cheese, tomato sauce and any reasonable number of fillings, which is then folded over and deep-fried. Panzerotti rise during this process, creating a pocket containing a considerable amount of steam which should be partially released prior to eating.

Canada
Since the mid-1960s, panzerotti have been a popular fast food item in Canada. Commercialized frozen versions are called Pizza Pockets or Pizza Pops.

Winnipeg, Manitoba is a Canadian hub for panzerotti production in Canada and worldwide, where Naleway Foods has been dubbed the second-largest processor of pierogies and panzerottis in Canada.

See also
Calzone
Chebureki
Deep-fried pizza
Hot Pockets
Pizza Pops
Pizza puff
Pizza rolls
Stromboli
U' pastizz 'rtunnar

References

Calzones
Cuisine of Apulia
Cuisine of New Jersey
Deep fried foods
Italian-American cuisine
Pizza styles
Street food in Italy